Daniil Sergeyevich Medvedev (born 11 February 1996) is a Russian professional tennis player. He is currently ranked world No. 6  by the Association of Tennis Professionals (ATP), and was ranked as the singles world No. 1 for 16 total weeks. Medvedev has won 18 ATP Tour singles titles, including the 2021 US Open and 2020 ATP Finals. In the former, Medvedev defeated then-world No. 1 Novak Djokovic in the final to deny him the Grand Slam. In the latter, he became the first and only player to defeat the top three ranked players in the world en route to the year-end championship title. He has also won four Masters 1000 titles and contested four major finals. Medvedev made his ATP Tour main draw debut at the singles event of the 2015 Kremlin Cup. In 2017, he participated in a major for the first time at Wimbledon, where he defeated world No. 3 Stan Wawrinka. In 2018, Medvedev won his first ATP Tour singles titles at Sydney and Winston-Salem, and his first ATP 500 title in Tokyo. He achieved a breakthrough in 2019, making his top 10 debut after Wimbledon and reaching six consecutive tournament finals, including at the US Open. In February 2022, Medvedev became the first man outside of the Big Three to hold the world No. 1 ranking since Andy Murray in November 2016, the third Russian man following Yevgeny Kafelnikov in 1999 and Marat Safin in 2000, and the 27th man overall.

Early and personal life
Medvedev was born in Moscow to Sergey Medvedev and Olga Medvedeva. Daniil's father, a computer engineer, developed his own business of building materials sales, from the mid-1980s to the early 2010s. Medvedev has two older sisters named Julia and Elena, 12 and 8 years his senior, respectively. When he was 6 years old, his mother noticed an advertisement for group tennis lessons at the pool where he was taking swimming lessons. His father encouraged him to enroll. Medvedev's first tennis teacher was Ekaterina Kryuchkova, a former coach of professional tennis player Vera Zvonareva among others. Daniil's other childhood activities besides sport included harpsichord and guitar lessons.

Medvedev studied physics and math at a specialized school before graduating early and enrolling in economics and commerce at the Moscow State Institute of International Relations. He later dropped out to focus on tennis. He then switched to the Russian State University of Physical Education, Sport, Youth, and Tourism, where he received his diploma as coach. With his family he moved to Antibes, France where he trained at the tennis academy. His parents have been living in France since then, as retirees. As a result of living mostly overseas after turning 18, Medvedev can speak French and English fluently, besides his native Russian.

Medvedev married his girlfriend Daria Chernyshkova, a Moscow State University graduate and former juniors tennis player, in Moscow on 12 September 2018. On October 14, 2022, he announced with his wife, Daria, the birth of their daughter.
In September 2019, he credited his marriage for the improvement of his tennis results: "Before I made a proposal, I had been on the 65th place in the ranking, and then in ten months I've won two major tournaments and entered the top 10. We have significantly rebuilt our life, we work for each other. I earn [money], and Dasha helps me to earn more". Daria also works as his assistant, e.g., she helps to procure travel visas which is not easy with a Russian passport. When he won the US Open on 12 September 2021, his first Grand Slam singles title, Medvedev joked, referring to the final being on the same day as his wedding anniversary, "If I lose, I have no time to find a present. So I have to win this match."

Medvedev has been listed as an "unsuitable" subject to compulsory military service in the Russian Armed Forces because of his minor health issues due to the preterm birth at 8 months. Like many other Russian tennis players, Medvedev considered switching to the flag of Kazakhstan in the beginning of his professional career for a lack of support from the Russian Tennis Federation. Sports psychologist Francisca Dauzet has been a part of his French-speaking entourage since 2018. He is a supporter of FC Bayern Munich.

Junior career
Medvedev played his first junior match in July 2009 at the age of 13 at a grade 4 tournament in Estonia. In December 2010, he won his first junior title as a qualifier at just his third tournament.

2012–2013 would see Medvedev surge on the junior circuit as he won six titles between October 2012 and July 2013 which included four consecutive titles. He made his junior Grand Slam debut at 2013 Junior Wimbledon where he won his first round match against Hong Seong-chan but lost in the second round to 2nd seed Nikola Milojević. At the 2013 Junior US Open, he went into the tournament seeded 10th and made the third round where he lost to Johan Tatlot.

Medvedev reached his career-high junior ranking of world No. 13 at the beginning of 2014 and went into the 2014 Junior Australian Open seeded 8th. He ended his junior career after a first round loss at 2014 Junior Wimbledon.

Medvedev ended his junior career with an overall win–loss record of 109–43 and wins over several future stars including Alexander Zverev and Reilly Opelka.

Junior Grand Slam results – singles:

Australian Open: 3R (2014)
French Open: 3R (2014)
Wimbledon: 2R (2013)
US Open: 3R (2013)

Career

2015–2016 Early pro career
Medvedev made his ATP main draw debut at the 2015 Kremlin Cup, partnering Aslan Karatsev in the doubles event. The two defeated Aliaksandr Bury and Denis Istomin in the first round but were defeated by Radu Albot and František Čermák in the second round.

As a qualifier, Medvedev made his ATP singles main draw debut at the 2016 Nice Open, losing to Guido Pella in three sets. Three weeks later he earned his first singles ATP World Tour win at the 2016 Ricoh Open, defeating Horacio Zeballos in straight sets.

Medvedev was disqualified from the second round of the Savannah Challenger event (in Georgia, U.S.) for comments he made after the umpire ruled in favor of his opponent. Medvedev thought he had won a break point against his opponent Donald Young's serve, but chair umpire Sandy French ruled that his returning shot had gone out. After that, Medvedev said Young and French were friends. As both parties are black, he was disqualified mid-match for allegedly 'question[ing] the impartiality of the umpire based on her race'.

2017 First ATP final
In January 2017, Medvedev reached his first ATP singles final. In the final at the Chennai Open he lost to Roberto Bautista Agut in two sets. As a result, Medvedev jumped 34 positions from 99 to 65 in the ATP rankings, a new career-high. In February, he advanced to the quarterfinals of both the Open Sud de France and the Open 13, losing to Jo-Wilfried Tsonga and Lucas Pouille respectively.

In June, he made it to the quarterfinals of the Rosmalen Grass Court Championships, defeating the 6th seed, Robin Haase, and Thanasi Kokkinakis before losing to Ivo Karlović in straight sets. At the Aegon Championships, he advanced to his first ATP 500 quarterfinal by beating Nicolas Mahut and Kokkinakis in the first two rounds, before losing to the No. 6 seed, Grigor Dimitrov, in the quarterfinals. One week later, he on grass advanced to the semifinal of Eastbourne International, losing to Novak Djokovic.

Medvedev registered his maiden Grand Slam match win at the 2017 Wimbledon Championships, defeating fifth seed and world No. 3, Stan Wawrinka, in the first round in four sets. He lost in the next round to Ruben Bemelmans. Medvedev was handed three fines totaling $14,500 (£11,200) for his conduct during the match with Bemelmans: $7,000 for insulting the umpire on two occasions and $7,500 for throwing coins under the umpire's chair.

2018 First ATP titles
Medvedev started the 2018 season by qualifying for the Sydney International. He reached the final which he won against Australian Alex de Minaur. The final was the youngest ATP Tour tournament final since 2007, when a 20-year-old Rafael Nadal defeated a 19-year-old Novak Djokovic in the final of Indian Wells. It also was the tournament's youngest final since 1989.

In August, Medvedev won his second ATP title at the 2018 Winston-Salem Open after defeating Steve Johnson in straight sets. In October, Medvedev won his first ATP 500 and third career ATP title in Tokyo as a qualifier, overcoming Japanese star and No. 3 seeded, Kei Nishikori, in straight sets in the final. This triumph brought him to a new career high ranking of No. 22 and made him the No. 1 player in Russia. The victory also marked the third consecutive final that Medvedev had beaten the home favorite in to win the title. Medvedev reached the Kremlin Cup semifinal, losing to his countryman and eventual champion Karen Khachanov. One week later, he made the semifinals at the ATP 500 Swiss Indoors event, which he lost to Roger Federer. After the tournament, he achieved a new career high ranking of world No. 16.

Medvedev finished 2018 with the most hard court match wins of any player on the ATP Tour (38 wins). He also had the most titles on hard court tournaments (3 titles), tying with Roger Federer, Novak Djokovic and Karen Khachanov.

2019 Two Masters titles, US Open final
Medvedev started the season strongly by reaching the final of the Brisbane International, defeating Andy Murray, Milos Raonic and Jo-Wilfried Tsonga en route, but then lost to Kei Nishikori. At the Australian Open, he was seeded 15th, the first time he was seeded at a major. He reached the round of 16 for the first time in his career, where he was defeated by eventual champion Novak Djokovic. In February, Medvedev won his fourth ATP title at the Sofia Open, beating Márton Fucsovics in the final. The following week, Medvedev lost in the semifinals of Rotterdam to Gaël Monfils. Medvedev entered the Monte Carlo Masters having only won two of his 13 career matches on clay courts. Despite this, he reached his first ever Masters 1000 quarterfinal at the event after defeating world No. 8 Stefanos Tsitsipas. In the quarterfinals, Medvedev earned his first triumph over a world number 1 ranked player, when he defeated Djokovic in three sets. His run ended in the semifinals against Dušan Lajović. At the Barcelona Open, Medvedev earned his third successive top 10 victory (this time over Kei Nishikori) to reach his first clay-court final. There, he was defeated by world No. 5 Dominic Thiem. Following his victory over Nishikori, Medvedev experienced a five-match losing streak, including an opening-round defeat at the French Open. He returned to form on the grass courts of Queen's Club, reaching his sixth semifinal of the season where he lost to Gilles Simon. Medvedev made his top 10 debut after reaching the third round of Wimbledon.

The North American hard-court swing proved to be a momentous breakthrough in Medevdev's career, as he reached four tournament finals (in Washington, Montreal, Cincinnati, and the US Open), becoming only the third man in tennis history to do so (after Ivan Lendl and Andre Agassi). In Washington, he was defeated by Nick Kyrgios in the final. He followed this up with a strong performance at the Rogers Cup, reaching his first Masters final after beating top 10 players Dominic Thiem and Karen Khachanov. In the final, he was defeated by defending champion Rafael Nadal. Medvedev would reach a second consecutive Masters final at Cincinnati after beating defending champion Djokovic for the second time, where he defeated David Goffin in straight sets for his first Masters title.

Medvedev entered the US Open as the world No. 5. In his second round match, he fought off cramping to defeat Hugo Dellien in four sets. He then defeated Feliciano López in a contentious match for which he was fined $5,000 for unsportsmanlike conduct and $4,000 for flipping off the crowd. Medvedev next recovered from a set and a break deficit to beat Dominik Köpfer and reach his first Major quarterfinal. He then beat former champion Stan Wawrinka in the quarterfinals and Grigor Dimitrov in the semifinals to reach his first Grand Slam final. There, Medvedev was defeated by Rafael Nadal in five sets.

Medvedev followed up his success in North America with his maiden title on Russian soil at the St. Petersburg Open, to become the first Russian to win the tournament in 15 years. Medvedev then won a second consecutive title at the Shanghai Masters, defeating Alexander Zverev in the final. By reaching the final, Medvedev became the 7th man since 2000 to reach at least nine finals in a season. He ended the season losing his last four matches, including all three round robin matches in his ATP Finals debut.

2020 ATP Finals champion, third Masters title

Medvedev opened his season at the inaugural edition of the ATP Cup as Russia's top ranked singles player. He led Russia to the semifinals, where they were eliminated by the Serbian team after Medvedev lost to world No. 2 Novak Djokovic. At the Australian Open, Medvedev was eliminated in the fourth round by former champion Stan Wawrinka in five sets. During the February indoor season, Medvedev suffered early defeats in Rotterdam and Marseille.

When the season resumed in August after a six-month hiatus due to the COVID-19 pandemic, Medvedev failed to defend his title at Cincinnati Masters, losing to Roberto Bautista Agut in the quarterfinals. As the 3rd seed in the US Open, Medvedev reached the semifinals before losing to eventual champion Dominic Thiem. At the French Open, Medvedev exited the tournament in the first round for the fourth consecutive year, losing to Márton Fucsovics. His struggles with form continued into the October indoor season, failing to string together more than two consecutive match wins in the St. Petersburg Open and Vienna Opens. Medvedev then resurged, winning his first title in a year at the Paris Masters.

At the ATP Finals, Medvedev won all his round-robin matches in straight sets, over Alexander Zverev, Novak Djokovic and Diego Schwartzman. Medvedev recovered from a set- and break-deficit to defeat Rafael Nadal in the semifinals, before beating Dominic Thiem in the final, once again coming from a set down.  With the victory, he became the first player to have defeated the world's top three players at the ATP Finals, and only the fourth player (after Djokovic, Boris Becker, and David Nalbandian) to have done so at any tournament since the inception of the ATP Tour in 1990.

2021 US Open, Davis and ATP Cups champion

At the second edition of the ATP Cup in February, Medvedev led Russia to the title, going 4–0 in singles. This included 3 top ten victories (over Diego Schwartzman, Alexander Zverev, and Matteo Berrettini) extending his win streak over top 10 opponents to ten wins. Medvedev then reached his second Grand Slam final at the Australian Open after straight sets victories over Andrey Rublev and Stefanos Tsitsipas, extending his win streak against top 10 opponents to twelve wins, and his overall win streak to twenty wins. In the final, he was defeated by the defending champion Novak Djokovic in straight sets.

Medvedev won his first title of the season at the Open 13 in Marseille, defeating Pierre-Hugues Herbert in the final. With the win, Medvedev ascended to world number 2 in the ATP rankings, becoming the first man outside of the Big Four to occupy a position in the top 2 since Lleyton Hewitt in July 2005. On 13 April, Medvedev tested positive for COVID-19 and was forced to withdraw from the 2021 Monte-Carlo Masters. At the French Open, Medvedev reached the quarterfinals, where he lost to Stefanos Tsitsipas.

With the grass-court season, Medvedev took a wildcard to play in the Mallorca Championships, where he won his first career grass-court title. At Wimbledon, he reached the fourth round for the first time in his career. There, he lost to Hubert Hurkacz in a match plagued by rain delays. Medvedev entered both the men's singles and the men's doubles events at the 2020 Summer Olympics. In doubles, Medvedev and Aslan Karatsev were defeated in the first round by Slovakia's Filip Polášek and Lukáš Klein. In singles, he defeated Kazakhstan's Alexander Bublik, India's Sumit Nagal, and Italy's Fabio Fognini to reach the quarterfinals. In the quarterfinals, he lost to Spain's Pablo Carreño Busta. To start the North American hardcourt season, Medvedev competed at the Canadian Open, where he won the title by defeating Reilly Opelka in the final. The following week, he competed at the Cincinnati Masters, reaching the semifinals where he was defeated by Andrey Rublev.

At the US Open, Medvedev dropped just one set en route to his first major title, defeating Novak Djokovic in the final. The final received immense attention, as Djokovic was vying to become only the second man in the Open Era to achieve the calendar-year Grand Slam.

Following the US Open, Medvedev participated in the Laver Cup as part of Team Europe. Team Europe comfortably won the title, with Medvedev winning his match against Denis Shapovalov in straight sets. At the Indian Wells Masters, Medvedev was upset in the fourth round by Grigor Dimitrov. At the Paris Masters, Medvedev reached the final for the second consecutive year, but lost to Novak Djokovic in three sets. In his third ATP Finals, Medvedev qualified for the semifinals after winning all of his group matches. He there defeated Casper Ruud, but lost in straight sets to Alexander Zverev in the final. Medvedev ended his 2021 season by leading Russia to the Davis Cup title, not dropping a set through his five singles matches.

2022 Australian Open final, world No. 1 

Medvedev represented Russia in the third edition of the ATP Cup. Russia advanced to the semifinals of the tournament after Medvedev and Roman Safiullin went undefeated in doubles. There, Medvedev won his singles match against Canada's Félix Auger-Aliassime, but Russia was eliminated when Medvedev and Safiullin were defeated in the decisive doubles rubber.

In January, Medvedev reached the final of the Australian Open for the second successive year. En route to the final, he beat home favorite Nick Kyrgios, world No. 10 Auger-Aliassime (saving match point), and world No. 4 Stefanos Tsitsipas. In the final, he was defeated in five epic sets by Rafael Nadal despite taking a two-set lead. At 5 hours and 24 minutes, it was the second longest Major final ever played. In February, Medvedev was nominated for the Laureus World Sports Award for Breakthrough of the Year award.

Medvedev entered the Mexican Open with the opportunity to gain the world number 1 ranking from Novak Djokovic. Medvedev reached the semifinals where he was defeated once again by Rafael Nadal in a rematch of the Australian Open final. However, as Djokovic was also defeated in the Dubai quarterfinals being played simultaneously, Medvedev ascended to world number 1 for the first time. Medvedev thus became the first man outside of the Big Four to hold the top ranking since Andy Roddick in February 2004, and the third Russian man to achieve the ranking, following Yevgeny Kafelnikov in 1999 and Marat Safin in 2000.

At the Indian Wells Masters, Medvedev lost to Gael Monfils in the third round. The loss resulted in his losing the number 1 ranking, with Novak Djokovic once again taking the top spot. Medvedev had a chance to reclaim the number 1 ranking the following fortnight if he reached the semifinals at the Miami Masters, but fell one match short, losing to defending champion Hubert Hurkacz in the quarterfinals. 

On April 2, Medvedev announced that he would miss the beginning of the clay court season to recover from a hernia procedure. On April 20, the All England Club announced a ban on all Russian and Belarusian players, including Medvedev, from competing at the 2022 Wimbledon Championships due to the Russian invasion of Ukraine.

Following his recovery from surgery, Medvedev returned to play at the Geneva Open, where he lost his opening match to Richard Gasquet in straight sets. At the French Open, Medvedev was eliminated in the fourth round by Marin Čilić. However, as Novak Djokovic failed to defend his title, Medvedev reclaimed the number 1 ranking.

Medvedev entered three tournaments in the grass court season, Rosmalen, Halle, and Mallorca. At his first event in Rosmalen, he reached the final without dropping a set before suffering a shock loss to world No. 205 Tim van Rijthoven. He then reached the final at Halle, once again without dropping a set, where he lost to Hubert Hurkacz. In Mallorca, Medvedev was defeated in the quarterfinals by Roberto Bautista Agut.

Medvedev started his North American summer hardcourt season by winning the title at the Los Cabos Open defeating Cameron Norrie in the final. In his opening round match against Rinky Hijikata, he recorded his 250th career singles match win. At the Canadian Open, Medvedev, who was the defending champion, lost his opening match to Nick Kyrgios. At the Cincinnati Masters, Medvedev was defeated by Stefanos Tsitsipas in the semifinals. Medvedev was yet again defeated by Kyrgios at the US Open, resulting in Medvedev losing his number one ranking.

Medvedev began the fall indoor-hardcourt season by competing at the Moselle Open, where he lost his opening match to Stan Wawrinka in three sets. Medvedev next competed at the Astana Open where he reached the semifinals. In his semifinal match, against Novak Djokovic, Medvedev was forced to retire with the match level at one-set-all with a leg injury. Medvedev returned to play at the Vienna Open where he defeated Denis Shapovalov in the final to win his second title of the year, and second ATP 500 title of his career. Medvedev finished the year on a 4 match losing skid, losing in the opening round in Paris Masters, and losing all three of his round robin matches in the ATP Finals in third-set tiebreakers. This resulted in him dropping to world no. 7 in the year-end rankings.

2023 Three consecutive titles, Indian Wells Final  

Medvedev started the season at the Adelaide International where he reached the semifinals, losing to Novak Djokovic in straight sets. Seeded 7th at the Australian Open, he defeated opponents Marcos Giron and John Millman before losing to Sebastian Korda in straight sets in the third round. As a result, Medvedev dropped out of the Top 10 to World No. 12. 

In February, Medvedev entered the ABN AMRO Open in Rotterdam seeded 6th, where he made it to the finals whilst dropping only one set. In the final, he defeated Italian No. 1 Jannik Sinner in three sets, thus returning back to the Top 10.  The following week, Medvedev entered the Qatar ExxonMobil Open seeded third and won the tournament, defeating Andy Murray in straight sets in the final. 

In March, Medvedev defeated No. 2 seed Andrey Rublev in straight sets in an all-Russian final to win in Dubai his third title in three weeks, and his 18th title overall thus winning titles in 18 different cities and becoming the first man in the Open Era to accomplish the feat. In this tournament, he did not drop a set including his win against No. 1 seed Novak Djokovic, snapping his 20-match winning streak. As a result he moved back to world No. 6 on 6 March 2023.

At the next Masters 1000 2023 BNP Paribas Open he reached back-to-back quarterfinals defeating 12th seed Alexander Zverev. His victory against American, Frances Tiafoe propelled him into the final, where he will face Carlos Alcaraz. His victory in the final could make him the first Russian winner at the event.

Rivalries

Stefanos Tsitsipas 

Daniil Medvedev and Stefanos Tsitsipas have faced each other 11 times since 2018, with Medvedev leading the rivalry, 7–4. They are considered to be two of the best tennis players of their generation. Medvedev won his first five matches against Tsitsipas, but Tsitsipas has won four of their last six.

Playing style and mentality
Medvedev is a counterpuncher. Standing at 1.98 m (6 ft 6 in) tall, he has an extremely powerful first serve capable of reaching 145 mph (232 km/h). He also hits long, flat groundstrokes, often wearing opponents down with lengthy baseline rallies. 

Medvedev is also known for his strong return of serve. He tends to adopt an extremely deep position at the back of the court which allows him to hit full-swing groundstrokes rather than blocking the serve back into play. He also possesses one of the best backhands on tour. His forehand is generally the weaker shot of the two. Medvedev is also a mentally strong competitor, which is evident in his attitude on the court, playing style, and demeanor in big matches. According to Francisca Dauzet, the performance coach he has been working with since 2018, he has “monstrous mental potential” and is learning to control his impatience. At times he has been “unable to channel his outbursts”, but Dauzet described him as a quick learner who is "fast at catching things".

Medvedev's preferred surface is hardcourt and he has been one of the very best and most consistent players on the surface since he first broke through to the top 10 in 2019. He struggles much more on clay due to his extremely flat strokes and the fact that his movement, one of his biggest strengths on a hardcourt, is hampered. However, he has still achieved solid results on the surface. 

With his playing style, Novak Djokovic has described Medvedev as a "very complete" player and Alexander Zverev called him "the best player in the world right now" in October 2019. 2019 ATP Finals champion, Stefanos Tsitsipas, once described his way of playing as "very boring"; however, later said "he just plays extremely smart and outplays you".

Endorsements
Medvedev is endorsed by Lacoste for apparel and shoes, Tecnifibre for racquets, and Bovet for watches. He also [for the Russian-speaking world mostly] has been employed as an ambassador by BMW, Tinkoff Bank, and HyperX for gaming accessories. He was previously endorsed by Lotto for apparel and shoes until 2019. Since November 2021, he has been signed as a promoter of the Guojiao 1573 brand.

Career statistics

Grand Slam singles performance timeline

Current through the 2023 Australian Open.

Grand Slam tournament finals

Finals 4 (1 title, 3 runner-ups)

Year-end championship finals

Singles 2 (1 title, 1 runner-up)

Team competitions finals

Records
 These records were attained in the Open Era.

Awards

National
The Russian Cup in the nominations:
Male Tennis Player of the Year: 2019, 2021;
Team of the Year: 2019, 2021.
 Sports title "Merited Master of Sports of Russia" (2019)

Notes

References

External links

 
 
 
 

1996 births
Grand Slam (tennis) champions in men's singles
Living people
Russian male tennis players
Tennis players at the 2020 Summer Olympics
Tennis players from Moscow
Russian expatriate sportspeople in Monaco
Russian expatriate sportspeople in France
Olympic tennis players of Russia
US Open (tennis) champions
ATP number 1 ranked singles tennis players